The 2020–21 Telekom S-League was the 17th season of the Telekom S-League, the top football league in the Solomon Islands.

The league started on 8 August 2020.

Teams
Eleven teams play the 2020 season, an increase from nine in the 2019–2020 season. 
FC Guadalcanal from the previous season did not enter, and were replaced by Central Coast, Honiara City and Southern United.

Central Coast (Honiara)
Henderson Eels (Honiara)
Honiara City (Honiara)
Isabel United (Isabel Province) 
Kossa (Honiara)
Laugu United (Honiara)
Malaita Kingz (Malaita)
Marist (Honiara)
Real Kakamora (Makira-Ulawa)
Solomon Warriors (Honiara)
Southern United (Honiara)

League table

Top scorers

References

Solomon Islands S-League seasons
Solomon Islands
S-League